The High Flyer is a 1926 American silent action film directed by Harry Joe Brown and starring Reed Howes,  Ethel Shannon and Paul Panzer. It was distributed by the independent Rayart Pictures, the forerunner of Monogram Pictures.

Synopsis
Jim, a World War I veteran and airplane designer has his plans for a new model stolen by his associate Dick, who wants to sell them to a wealthy manufacturer while wooing his daughter Winnie.

Cast
 Reed Howes as 	Jim
 Ethel Shannon as 	Winnie
 James Bradbury Sr. as	Dick 
 Ray Hallor as 	Tom
 Paul Panzer as McGrew
 Josef Swickard	
 Cissy Fitzgerald		
 Ernest Hilliard	
 Earl Metcalfe		
 Joseph W. Girard

References

Bibliography
 Munden, Kenneth White. The American Film Institute Catalog of Motion Pictures Produced in the United States, Part 1. University of California Press, 1997.

External links
 

1920s American films
1926 films
1920s action films
1920s English-language films
American silent feature films
American action films
American black-and-white films
Films directed by Harry Joe Brown
Rayart Pictures films